Daniel Ullman, also spelled Ullmann (April 28, 1810 – September 20, 1892) was an American lawyer and politician from New York. He also served as a Union Army general in the American Civil War; raising and leading colored troops.

Political career
Born in Wilmington, Delaware, Ullman graduated from Yale University in 1829 and moved to New York City, where he began practicing law. A member of the Whig Party, he became a prominent member of the faction opposed to the leadership of William H. Seward. A frequent candidate for office, his most notable campaign was as the American Party candidate for the governorship of New York in 1854, in which he won 26% of the vote.

Witness in the Burdell - Cunningham Trial
In late 1856 Ullman moved into a boarding house that was run by Mrs. Emma Augusta Cunningham at 31 Bond Street in Manhattan.  The attorney did not really socialize much with his fellow lodgers, but he attended a party held in the boarding house on January 14, 1857.  Although he later testified that he only spent half an hour at the party, he did admit seeing some people there who he recognized as respectable people.  He probably saw two of his fellow lodgers, Dr. Harvey Burdell and Mr. John Eckel.  Burdell, a wealthy dentist, had been having a close relationship with Mrs. Cunningham.
How close would be a subject of dispute.  She claimed she married him, and would later try to pass off a hired baby as her own by him.  Mrs. Cunningham also seemed to be carrying on a close relationship with Mr. Eckel.  On January 31, 1857  Burdell would be stabbed to death by an intruder while at his desk in the boarding house.  Suspicion fell on Mrs. Cunningham and Mr. Eckel, and a coroner's court was held to examine the evidence regarding the murder.  Mr. Ullman was a witness (oddly he had come home late, heard nothing unusual, and went to his room, so he was not suspected).
The next morning he was awakened by the noise of the police and Mrs. Cunningham and others upon the discovery of Dr. Burdell's body.  Ullman's testimony would be relatively trivial, except that he claimed Mrs. Cunningham did show grief and horror at the event.  The Coroner's Court was presided over by Coroner Edward Connory, an Irish immigrant who enjoyed teasing Mr. Ullman, who was good natured enough to return the banter.  Cunningham and Eckel were both tried for the murder of Burdell, and prosecuted by New York City's District Attorney A. Oakley Hall later Mayor of the city.  They were acquitted.  The case was never solved.

Ullman's experience as an unexpected witness in a famous unsolved New York City murder mystery was somewhat repeated in 1870, when Major General Francis Preston Blair Jr. was a witness to members of the family of Benjamin Nathan running out of their home for help when they found Mr. Nathan murdered. The Nathan home was on West 23rd Street in Manhattan. General Blair was in bed in a hotel across the street, and awaken by the cries of the Nathan family members.  Blair had been the running mate to former New York Governor Horatio Seymour when they ran for President and Vice President against Ulysses Grant and Schuyler Colfax in 1868. Seymour had run for re-election to his first term as Governor of New York in 1854, and was defeated by Myron Clark due, in part, to the third party candidacy of Ullman as the Know Nothing Candidate running such a successful campaign.

Civil War Service
During the Civil War, Ullman became colonel of the 78th New York Infantry Regiment. Captured at the Battle of Cedar Mountain in August 1862, he was detained at Libby Prison until he was paroled two months later. He later approached President Abraham Lincoln about the possibility of enlisting African Americans as soldiers. After subsequent discussion, in January 1863 Ullman was promoted to brigadier general and sent to Louisiana where he raised five regiments of African Americans as soldiers in a unit that was designated the Corps d'Afrique. He now commanded a brigade made up of those colored infantry regiments and a regiment of colored engineers.

Ullman led his men into the Siege of Port Hudson, where they suffered heavy casualties. Afterwards he commanded the District of Port Hudson and continued to lead colored troops for the rest of the war, having a full division in mid 1864. Developing an alcohol problem, he was relieved of his command shortly before the war ended. Ullman was mustered out in August 1865 and was made a Brevet Major General for his war service.

Post war
Ullman died in Nyack, New York in September 1892.

References
 
Jack Finney; Forgotten News: The Crime of the Century and Other Lost Stories; New York; Simon & Schuster—A Firesign Book; 1983, 1985; [pp. 3–186 deal with the Burdell murder case; Ullman's testimony is discussed on pp. 77–79].
Edmund Pearson; Murder at Smutty Nose and Other Murders; Garden City, New York; Doubleday & Co.—The Sun Dial Press; 1926, 1938; [pp. 291–320: "Number 31 Bond Street; or, the Accomplishments of Mrs. Cunningham".  Ullman is mentioned only briefly on page 306].
Tyler Anbinder; Nativism & Slavery: The Northern Know Nothings & the Politics of the 1850s; New York; Oxford; Oxford University Press; 1992. [Ullman's involvement in the 1854 campaign is covered between pp. 77–84; where it is reported a rumor that he was born in India to Hindu parents was used against him].

External links

 Yale Obituary Record
 

1810 births
1892 deaths
Yale University alumni
19th-century American military personnel
New York (state) lawyers
New York (state) Whigs
19th-century American politicians
People of New York (state) in the American Civil War
Union Army generals
New York (state) Know Nothings
19th-century American lawyers